Belyea's Point Lighthouse is an -tall landfall lighthouse located along the Saint John River, near the community of Morrisdale. It was built in 1881, commenced operation on June 1, 1882, with Spafford Barker Belyea serving as its first keeper and later rebuilt at a slightly different location after having been damaged due to severe flooding in the 1930s. The Canadian Coast Guard owns the lighthouse, the land it is on, and maintains it.

The lighthouse is named for its original keeper, "Spafford Barker Belyea" and the area's original United Empire Loyalist settler, "Hendrick Belyea".

See also
 List of lighthouses in New Brunswick
 List of lighthouses in Canada

References

External links
 Aids to Navigation Canadian Coast Guard

Lighthouses completed in 1881
Lighthouses in New Brunswick
Buildings and structures in Kings County, New Brunswick
1881 establishments in Canada